Kathleen "Kathy" Foster is an American musician best known as the bassist for the indie rock band The Thermals and drummer for the All Girl Summer Fun Band.

Foster was raised Catholic in Sunnyvale, California and moved to Portland, Oregon in 1998. With Thermals bandmate Hutch Harris, she was in Haelah, Hutch and Kathy, and Urban Legends. With Foster on bass guitar, the Thermals became a mainstay of the Portland indie rock scene beginning in 2003. She continued to record and tour with the band until their 2018 dissolution. Foster also recorded drums on two of the band's seven albums, The Body, the Blood, the Machine (2006) and Now We Can See (2009). She also performs under the name Butterfly Transformation Service. She is the owner of the T-shirt company Daydream Factory.

References

External links

Kathy Foster at Discogs
 The Thermals' Kathy Foster Gets Lasso'd

Band links
 The Thermals Official Site
 The Thermals at the Sub Pop Records
All Girl Summer Fun Band Official Site

Living people
Musicians from Portland, Oregon
Sub Pop artists
American women drummers
American women singers
American rock bass guitarists
American rock drummers
American indie rock musicians
American punk rock musicians
Year of birth missing (living people)
American punk rock drummers
American punk rock bass guitarists
Indie rock drummers
Women bass guitarists
People from Sunnyvale, California
Singers from Oregon
Guitarists from Oregon
Women in punk